Bridgetown is an unincorporated community in Northampton County, Virginia, United States.

Hungars Church, Vaucluse, Westerhouse House, Winona, and Chatham are listed on the National Register of Historic Places.

Notable people
Chuck Churn, baseball player.

References

Unincorporated communities in Virginia
Unincorporated communities in Northampton County, Virginia